John McCall (1877–1951) was a Scottish footballer who played in the Football League for Notts County.

References

1877 births
1951 deaths
Scottish footballers
English Football League players
Association football forwards
Strathclyde F.C. players
Hibernian F.C. players
Bristol Rovers F.C. players
Arnold F.C. players